Vaanam Vasappadum is a 2002 Tamil-language film directed by P. C. Sreeram. The film stars newcomers Karthik Kumar and Poongkothai Chandrahasan and features Revathy, Nassar, Vijayakumar, and Thalaivasal Vijay in supporting roles. The music was composed by Mahesh Mahadevan with cinematography, editing by Kasi Viswanathan, and cinematography by Sreeram himself.

The film was based on a novel written by Sujatha. It released on 23 April 2002 and was the first high definition film to be shot, edited and released in India.

Plot 
Karthik, a young lawyer, falls in love with Poongothai, the daughter of a businessman. Poongothai's father and sister run a multi-level market and are imprisoned for false accusations. Karthik brings Poongothai to his parents and seeks permission from his mother and speech-impaired father. Karthik and Poongothai eventually get married after his parents' consent.

One day while travelling back home, their car breaks down, and they decide to board a bus. However, both of them miss each other while travelling in the bus, and Poongothai falls into the hands of a group of teenagers, who are projected as womanizers. In the event, Poongothai is raped by the group and is thrown out with her hands tied at the back. After the event, issues of how she faces the humiliation and gets justice for the act form the rest of the story.

Despite escaping somewhere else, Poongothai wants to fight back the humiliation. An opposition lawyer in the support of womanizers humiliates Poongothai in the court with vulgar questions. Two of the boys are kept captive under Karthik's family friend, a cop, to render poetic justice. The opposition lawyer appears to save the boys, but the boys, who have realised the error of their ways, push the lawyer. All three of them fall down to their deaths in the building's basement, which is under construction.

Cast 
Karthik Kumar as Karthik
Poongkothai Chandrahasan as Poongothai
Nassar as Karthik's father
Revathy as Karthik's mother
Vijayakumar as Poongothai's father
Thalaivasal Vijay as Opposition Lawyer
Kovai Sarala
Bosskey as Postman
Janaki Sabesh as Poongothai's sister
Vijay Adiraj as Aadhi Narayanan
Delhi Ganesh as Ganesan
Raviprakash as Karthik's family friend
Shankar Sundaram as Karthik's lawyer
Nithya Ravindran as Ganesan's wife

Production 
The film was based on a novel by Sujatha, which in turn was inspired from a real-life incident. After having read the story before 10 years the film got released, Sreeram had a thought of directing it and "reserved" his rights for filming it in future. The film was initially launched with newcomers Gautham and Pooja, a former Miss Chennai announced as the lead pair. However, Sreeram replaced the pair with another pair of debutants Karthik Kumar and Poongothai Chandrahasan. Kumar replaced Manish Borundia, who was dropped owing to his strong Hindi accent. Vaanam Vasappadum was Sreeram's third film as director and was the first motion picture in India to use high-definition digital technology. The film was showcased at the Mumbai International Film Festival and the ninth International Film Festival of Kerala in India.

Soundtrack 
The film's soundtrack and background score were composed by Mahesh Mahadevan, who earlier worked with Sreeram in Kuruthipunal, and it was his posthumous project before his death. The lyrics were written by Kavivarman and Jayendra.
"Vaanam Vasappadume" – Srinivas, Timmy
"Megame Megame" – Harini
"Uyire" – Hariharan, Ganga
"Kangal Theendi" – Hariharan, Swetha Menon
"Kanne Kanne" – Srinivas
"Seidhi Suda" – Ranjith
"Vaanin Uyaram" - Harish Raghavendra, Gopika Poornima

Reception 
Vaanam Vasappadum was released theatrically in India on 23 April 2004. Poongothai, the female lead was criticised heavily while Karthik Kumar, the male lead received rave reviews for his performance in the film. Malathi Rangarajan of The Hindu wrote, "[Poongothai] is a clear let down ... At least she could have worked on her expressions, particularly in the first half." The review also noted that, the screenplay was not so impressive and could have made the original story more insightful. However, the soundtrack received positive response with the song "Uyirae" being much appreciated for its music and visual theme. Baradwaj Rangan wrote for The Economic Times, "Somewhere down the line, Vaanam Vasappadum becomes a case of several powerful moments that don’t quite add up to a singularly powerful movie." After six months, digital colour correction was added which further improved the visual quality of the picture and the film was re-released in November 2004.

References

External links 

2004 films
Indian drama films
Films based on Indian novels
2000s Tamil-language films
Films about rape in India
2004 drama films